Conrad Poirier (born in Montreal July 17, 1912 – died January 12, 1968, in Montreal West) was a  Québécois photographer, a pioneer of photojournalism in Quebec.

Biography 
Self-taught photographer, Poirier began his career in 1932 with a Speed Graphic, a device that uses a 4 × 5 film, Poirier captures images of sports and cultural events Montréal. In addition, he photographed many famous Quebec personalities of the time. He was a freelance writer and sold his photos to large newspapers: The Gazette, Montreal Standard, La Patrie, La Presse. His customers included thirty Canadian media institutions both in French and English.

Honors and awards 
Popular entertainment and leisure places for Montrealers (Belmont Park, the Delorimier Stadium, Montreal Forum, the evenings at the chalet de la Montagne on Mount Royal, the public beaches of Saint Helen's Island and LaSalle), were the subject of several photo essays by Poirier for which he won numerous awards: Grand National Canadian Prize, Canadian Press Prize, Prize of the Association of Photographers of Canada.

Notes

External links 

 Archive Fonds located at Bibliothèque et Archives nationales du Québec.

1912 births
1968 deaths
Artists from Montreal
Canadian photojournalists